Charlie Gorman may refer to:

Charlie Gorman (speed skater), see Canada at the 1924 Winter Olympics
Charlie Gorman, character in I've Been Waiting for You (film)
Charlie Gorman, character in Gallows Hill (novel)

See also
Charles Gorman (disambiguation)